The Molise regional election of 1995 took place on 23 April 1995.

Marcello Veneziale (Democratic Party of the Left) was elected President of the Region, defeating Quintino Pallante (National Alliance) by a narrow margin.

For the first time the President of the Region was directly elected by the people, although the election was not yet binding and the President-elect could have been replaced during the term. This is precisely what happened in 1998, when a centrist majority ousted Veneziale and replaced him with Michele Iorio (a splinter of the Italian People's Party, who switched to the Democratic Union for the Republic). In 1999 Iorio switched again party, this time to Forza Italia, and formed a centre-right government, but was soon replaced by a centre-left majority, which reinstated Veneziale.

Results

Source: Ministry of the Interior

Elections in Molise
1995 elections in Italy
April 1995 events in Europe